Lim Min-hyeok (born 5 March 1997) is a South Korean football midfielder who plays for Busan IPark in K League 2.

Club career 
Lim played college football for Suwon Technical High School.

Lim joined FC Seoul in 2016 and made his league debut against Jeju United on 24 July 2016. In the game, he was sent off after getting two yellow cards.

Lim joined Gwangju FC in 2018

Lim joined Gyeongnam FC in 2021

On 31 December 2021, FC Seoul announced that Lim had a signed contract, a 3 year deal until 2024.

On 28 February 2023, he was loaned to Busan IPark.

International career 
He has been a member of the South Korea national U-20 team since 2015.

Club career statistics

References

External links
 
 Lim Min-hyeok – National Team stats at KFA 

1997 births
Living people
Association football midfielders
South Korean footballers
FC Seoul players
Gwangju FC players
Gyeongnam FC players
Busan IPark players
K League 1 players
K League 2 players
South Korea under-20 international footballers